Capulálpam de Méndez is a town and municipality in the Sierra Juárez in Oaxaca in south-western Mexico. 
It is part of the Ixtlán District in the Sierra Norte de Oaxaca region.
The name "Capulálpam" in Nahuatl means "land of the chokecherry tree," a common type of tree in the area. In 2005 the population was 1,313.

Environment

The municipality covers an area of 19.14 km² of rugged mountainous terrain. The town is at an altitude of 2,040 meters above sea level in a high mountain valley.

The climate is predominantly cool and wet. Common flowers include gladiolus, geraniums, roses, bougainvillea, tulips, and calla lilies.  Trees include ash, aguilar, ayacahuite, oak, and Madrano ocotal, as well as fruit-bearing walnuts, pears, quince, apple, peach, plum and chokecherry.

Common birds are the eagle, hawk, crow, owl, dove, vulture, bat, swallow, sparrow, lark, quail, pheasant, picocanda and magpie. Wild animals include fox, coyote, badger, armadillo, wild boar, deer, cacomistle, opossum, cougar, skunk, jaguar, panther, rabbit and paca. The area also has lizards, coral snakes, rattlesnakes, tarantula and scorpion.

The municipality bottles its natural spring water to sell out of a small plant. Other community enterprises include selling gravel and eco-tourism ventures (zip-lining, etc.). Historically there had been gold mining in the community but through collective action, the community expelled the mining companies from their lands. However, the people have to continue to struggle to keep the mining corporations out. While the community owns the land, the national government technically owns rights to mineral and other resources beneath the soil.

Economy

As of 2005, the municipality had 326 households with a total population of 1,313. Some 89 spoke an indigenous language.

About 10% of the population is engaged in jewelry manufacture and another 10% work in a stone aggregate plant. Most others are engaged in agriculture.

The town has a beautiful 16th-century church dedicated to St. Matthew. The church interior is lined by 15 large, ornate, hand-carved religious scenarios that date from the 16th and 17th centuries.

In February 2008 Capulalpam was officially designated a "Pueblo Magico" (magical town), Oaxaca's first and Mexico's 33rd such town. The government also announced plans to construct a traditional healing center. The new designation and the healing center were expected to boost tourism. Opened by 2010, the center employs traditional healers, who provide medicinal plant therapy, massages, temazcal and herbal baths. It has an herbal pharmacy and offers basic training courses about a great variety of medicinal plants.
The 'temazcal' is a type of sweat lodge that uses the four elements of fire, air, water and earth for spiritual and physical healing. Participants may reach a level of consciousness similar to that of meditation.

References

External links

https://web.archive.org/web/20130118032606/http://www.capulalpam.mx/
https://web.archive.org/web/20130120064208/http://www.capulalpam.mx/no-a-la-minera-natividad/

Municipalities of Oaxaca
Tourism in Mexico
Pueblos Mágicos